Milwaukie City Hall is a historic building and the city hall of Milwaukie, Oregon, United States. The building was built during 1937–1938 as a Public Works Administration project.

References

External links

 City Hall at the City of Milwaukie

Buildings and structures in Clackamas County, Oregon
City halls in Oregon
Milwaukie, Oregon